The Best of Great White is a compilation album released by the American hard rock band Great White in 2000. The album was re-issued in 2005 by EMI subsidiary Madacy Records with the title Rock Breakout Years: 1988.

Track listing 
 "Rock Me" – 7:16 (from the album Once Bitten)
 "House of Broken Love" – 5:59 (from the album ...Twice Shy)
 "Stick It" – 3:58 (from the album Great White)
 "Call It Rock n' Roll" – 3:57 (from the album Hooked)
 "Once Bitten, Twice Shy" – 5:22 (from the album ...Twice Shy)
 "Face the Day" – 7:02 (from the album Shot in the Dark)
 "The Angel Song" – 4:52 (from the album ...Twice Shy)
 "Save Your Love" – 4:31 (from the album Once Bitten)
 "Babe I'm Gonna Leave You" (live) – 7:14 (recorded live on MTV Unplugged, June 5, 1990)
 "Big Goodbye" – 5:56 (from the album Psycho City)

References 

2000 greatest hits albums
2005 greatest hits albums
Great White compilation albums
Capitol Records compilation albums